Phillip Gifford was the Deputy Governor of Bombay from 1670 to 1676.

References

Year of birth missing
Year of death missing
Deputy Governors of Bombay